The 2014 African Volleyball Clubs Champions Championship was the 33rd staging of African's premier club volleyball competition held in Sousse, Tunisia over 20–29 March. The champions of the tournament will qualify for 2014 FIVB Volleyball Club World Championship in Belo Horizonte, Brazil as Africa's representative.

Group stage
The draw was held on 19 March 2014.

Pool A

|}

|}

Pool B

|}

|}

Pool C

|}

|}

Pool D

|}

|}

Knockout stage

Quarterfinals

|}

Semifinals

|}

Bronze medal match

|}

Final

|}

Final standing

Awards
MVP:  Elyes Karamosli (Espérance de Tunis)
Best Blocker:  Ahmed Kadhi (Étoile du Sahel)
Best Libero:  Anouer Taouerghi (CS Sfaxien)
Best Receiver:  Elyes Karamosli (Espérance de Tunis)
Best Server:  Ahmed Abdelal (Al Ahly SC)
Best Setter:  Mehdi Ben Cheikh (Espérance de Tunis)
Best Spiker:  Ahmed Kotb (Al Ahly SC)
Source: cavb.org, 30.03.2014

References

 Competition page on the African Volleyball Confederation website

External links
 Official African Volleyball Confederation website

2014
African Clubs Championship
Volleyball Clubs Champions Championship
2014 African Volleyball Clubs Champions Championship
African Volleyball Clubs Champions Championship
African Volleyball Clubs Champions Championship